Book swapping or book exchange is the practice of a swap of books between one person and another. Practiced among book groups, friends and colleagues at work, it provides an inexpensive way for people to exchange books, find out about new books and obtain a new book to read without having to pay.  Because swaps occur between individuals, without central distribution or warehousing, and without the copyright owner making a profit, the practice has been compared to peer-to-peer (P2P) systems such as BitTorrent—except that hard-copy original analog objects are exchanged.

College book exchange programs 
Many colleges and universities have developed online book exchange programs to help students save money on textbooks. Some colleges build their own systems and others use systems from third party service providers.

Informal book exchanges 

Some book exchanges are informal – a shelf or box is provided where books can be left or picked up. The exchange relies on users leaving and taking books and is generally not supervised.

This is a frequent practice in youth hostels where travellers can leave a book and take a different book with them. Some railway stations in Great Britain have informal book exchanges and one has also been set up in a phone box in Kington Magna.

Book swapping websites
 BookCrossing, an online book swapping site
 BookMooch, an online book swapping site
 ReadItSwapIt, an online book swapping site
 Little Free Library, trading posts that offer free books, housed in small containers, to members of the local community
 PaperBackSwap, an online book swapping club restricted to the USA
 Lenro, used to connect book readers locally (same college/neighborhood)

See also
 Collaborative consumption, a trend describing similar swapping and lending organizations
Public bookcase

References

External links
 The Guardian and Observer Book Swap: how to take part

 
Book promotion